Theodore Ross Castellucci (born 1965) is an American retired film score composer. A graduate of Lindenhurst Senior High School on Long Island, New York in 1983, Castellucci has won five BMI Film Music Awards. He's mostly known for working in comedy projects, and for being the recurring composer in films starring Adam Sandler, before being replaced by Rupert Gregson-Williams.  Castellucci appeared on screen as a band member (the guitarist) in "The Wedding Singer" and his last name was used for minor characters in both "The Wedding Singer" and "Big Daddy".

In 1990, he performed guitar on American singer Alisha's album Bounce Back.

Filmography

References

External links

American film score composers
Living people
American male film score composers
1965 births
American people of Italian descent